

NVC community M3 (Eriophorum angustifolium bog pool community) is one of the mire plant communities in the British National Vegetation Classification system.

It is a localised community of northern Britain. There are no subcommunities.

Community composition

The following constant species is found in this community:
 Common Cottongrass (Eriophorum angustifolium)

No rare species are associated with the community.

Distribution

This community is found in various locations in northern England, on Lewis in the Outer Hebrides, and in a site in Wales.

References

 Rodwell, J. S. (1991) British Plant Communities Volume 2 - Mires and heaths  (hardback),  (paperback)

M03